Guo Yue (born July 17, 1988 in Anshan, Liaoning) is a Chinese table tennis player and the 2007 women's world champion.

Controversy ensued in China when Guo Yue was kicked out of the National Table Tennis Team in 2015 for "poor behaviour" and lack of interest. As of 2015, she had left the table tennis field and was studying finance at Tsinghua University.

Career
She was a left-handed shakehand attack player and came from Liaoning, China, the province where Wang Nan, Chang Chenchen and Li Jia (all left-handed players) came from. She was the potential leading player in Chinese woman team. Her original partner in women's doubles was Niu Jianfeng, who came from Hebei. Her new partner was Li Xiaoxia, who was also her roommate.

Guo experienced series of losses in international games which led to her disappearance from the public eye for almost half a year. It is officially claimed "To help her mentally adjust". At the 2006 Asian Games in Doha, Guo returned to competition and took first place in women's singles, women's doubles and women's team. In 2007 from January to July, Guo attended six international opens and won four gold medals. At the selection match for 2007 World Table Tennis Championships in Zagreb, Guo qualified early on.

Guo Yue won the 2007 World Championships in Zagreb, Croatia, by defeating her compatriot Li Xiaoxia in the women's singles final. She also won the mixed doubles title with Wang Liqin.

Controversy

Rumours were rife in 2010 when Guo Yue was cited for "poor behaviour" and lack of interest in playing table tennis. An incident, cited on Chinese forum Tianya, stated that she was once tasked to attend a meeting and failed to do so, hence causing friction with China's top player Wang Nan. After the London 2012 Olympics, she was switched to a provincial team. In 2015, she was officially kicked out from the National Team and has gone on to study finance at Tsinghua University.

Achievements

1999 – Japan East Asian Junior Championship Women's Singles Champion
2000 – Asian Cup Women's Singles Runner-up
2002 – International Table Tennis Federation, ITTF Pro Tour Grand Finals Women's Singles Runner-up
2003 – Asian Championship Women's Team Champion, Women's Singles Second Runner-up, Runner-up of Women's Doubles at the 47 World Table Tennis Championship
2004 – Women's Doubles Bronze at the Athens Olympic, Women's Team Champion of World Table Tennis Championship, ITTF Pro Tour Events Final Women's Singles Champion and Women's Doubles Runner-up
2005 – Mixed Doubles (with Wang Liqin) at the 48th World Table Tennis Championship, bronze medal in Women's Singles
2006 – World Table Tennis Championship Women's Team Champion; Champion of Team, Women's Singles, Women's Doubles Champion (with Li Xiaoxia) at Asian Games
2007 – World Table Tennis Championship Women's singles Champion, Mixed Doubles Champion (with Wang Liqin)
2008 – World Table Tennis Championship Women's Team Champion; Asian Cup Champion; Women's Singles Bronze at the Beijing Olympic

See also
China at the 2012 Summer Olympics#Table tennis
Table tennis at the 2012 Summer Olympics – Women's singles
Table tennis at the 2012 Summer Olympics – Women's team

References

No. 47 – Guo Yue 100 Olympic Athletes To Watch

1988 births
Living people
Olympic gold medalists for China
Olympic bronze medalists for China
Olympic table tennis players of China
Table tennis players from Anshan
Table tennis players at the 2004 Summer Olympics
Table tennis players at the 2008 Summer Olympics
Olympic medalists in table tennis
Asian Games medalists in table tennis
Table tennis players at the 2012 Summer Olympics
Medalists at the 2012 Summer Olympics
Medalists at the 2008 Summer Olympics
Table tennis players at the 2006 Asian Games
Table tennis players at the 2010 Asian Games
Medalists at the 2004 Summer Olympics
Chinese female table tennis players
Medalists at the 2006 Asian Games
Medalists at the 2010 Asian Games
Asian Games gold medalists for China
Asian Games silver medalists for China
World Table Tennis Championships medalists